David Barker (18 February 1922 – 7 January 2009) was a British zoologist and neurologist specialising in animal neuroanatomy. He was professor emeritus of zoology at the University of Durham and is honoured by the annual award of the David Barker Prize in Zoology. In February 1963, he published Zoology and Medical Research.

Barker studied anatomy at the University of Oxford from 1941 to 1943 under the tutelage of John Zachary Young. Until he died in January 2009, he lived in  Durham with his wife, the author Pat Barker. His daughter is the novelist Anna Ralph. His son is also married with children.

Bibliography
 Zoology and Medical Research (University of Durham, 1963)

References

1922 births
2009 deaths
20th-century British zoologists
British neurologists
Academics of Durham University
People educated at Bryanston School
Alumni of Magdalen College, Oxford